Megan Imrie (born 14 February 1986) is a Canadian former biathlete who is also active in rodeo and long-distance running. She competed for Canada at the 2010 Winter Olympics and the 2014 Winter Olympics.

Along with Canadian biathletes Zina Kocher, Sandra Keith, Rosanna Crawford, and Megan Tandy, she posed for the Bold Beautiful Biathlon calendar to raise money to cover annual expenses for training and competition.

Imrie retired from the sport at the end of the 2013–14 season.

References

External links 
 
 
 
 
 

1986 births
Living people
People from Eastman Region, Manitoba
Sportspeople from Manitoba
Canadian female biathletes
Biathletes at the 2010 Winter Olympics
Biathletes at the 2014 Winter Olympics
Olympic biathletes of Canada
21st-century Canadian women